The Saint Petersburg Metro is a rapid transit system in Saint Petersburg, Russia. Construction began in early 1941, but was put on hold due to World War II and the subsequent Siege of Leningrad, during which the constructed stations were used as bomb shelters. It was finally opened on 15 November 1955.

Formerly known as the Order of Lenin Leningrad Metro named after V. I. Lenin, the system exhibits many typical Soviet designs and features exquisite decorations and artwork making it one of the most attractive and elegant metros in the world. Due to the city's unique geology, the Saint Petersburg Metro is also one of the deepest metro systems in the world and the deepest by the average depth of all the stations.

It has 72 stations including 7 transfer points. Serving about 2 million passengers daily, it is the 26th busiest metro system in the world.

History

Metro projects for the imperial capital

The question of building an underground road in Saint Petersburg arose in 1820. A resident of the city, a self-taught man by the name of Torgovanov, submitted a bold project to Tsar Alexander I — involving the digging of a tunnel from the center of the city to Vasilyevsky Island. The Russian ruler rejected the project and ordered the inventor to sign a pledge "not to engage in hare-brained schemes in the future, but to exercise his efforts in matters appropriate to his estate."
Other, more developed projects subsequently emerged, but they, too, received no recognition.

Many arguments were advanced against the construction of an underground road. The "city fathers" stated that the excavation works would "violate the amenities and respectability of the city"; the landlords affirmed that underground traffic would undermine the foundations of the buildings;  the merchants feared that "the open excavations would interfere with normal trade"; but the most violent adversaries of the novelty, the clergy, insisted that "the underground passages running near church buildings would detract from their dignity". Thus all the projects for the construction of an underground passage in Saint Petersburg, and later in Petrograd, remained on paper.

By the end of the 19th century, certain interested parties began discussing the possibility of opening the Russian Empire's first metropolitan railway system. The press of the time praised the initial plans, while engineers privately worried about the serious lack of experience in the sort of projects required to build a metro; at the time, Saint Petersburg did not even have electrified tramways. However, due to the wish of the municipal authorities of the time to take ownership of the metro after its eventual entry into service, none of the aforementioned projects ever came to fruition.

In 1901 the engineer Vladimir Pechkovsky presented his project to build an elevated station in the middle of Nevsky Prospect, opposite the Kazan Cathedral, and to link it, via elevated and underground sections of track (above the Ekaterinsky and Obvodny canals and beneath the Zabalkansky prospect) with the Baltiysky and Varshavsky Rail Terminals. In the same year, Reshevsky, also an engineer, working at the behest of the Emperor's minister for transport, came up with two possible projects, which aimed primarily to unite all of Saint Petersburg's main railway stations with one urban interchange. However, in 1903 Emperor Nicholas II rejected the scheme before any work ever started.

Almost all pre-revolutionary designs featured the concept of an elevated metro system, similar to the Paris or Vienna metros. However, as it was later discovered through the experience of operating uncovered ground-level metro sections in St. Petersburg (which were later closed due to the same reason), such projects would lead to many difficulties in its maintaining. Unfortunately, Russian engineers had neither sufficient equipment nor technical skills at the time to build deep-lying tunnels through the challenging ground beneath St. Petersburg.
In 1918 Moscow became the country's capital after the October Revolution of 1917 and the Russian Civil War (1917–1922) followed; for more than a decade plans to build a metro in Petrograd languished.

First phase construction, abandonment, and opening
In 1938 the question of building a metro for St Petersburg (by then renamed to Leningrad), resurfaced at the initiative of Alexei Kosygin,  Chairman of the Executive Committee of the Leningrad City Soviets of Working People's Deputies. Ivan Zubkov, an engineer who for his work was later to become a Hero of Socialist Labour was appointed the first director for the metro construction. The initial project was designed by the Moscow institute 'Metrogiprotrans', but on 21 January 1941 'Construction Directorate № 5 of the People's Commissariat' was founded as a body to specifically oversee the design and construction of the Leningrad Metro. By April 1941, 34 shafts for the initial phase of construction had been finished.

During the Second World War construction work was frozen due to severe lack of funding, manpower and equipment. At this time, many of the metro construction workers were employed in the construction and repair of railheads and other objects vital to the besieged city. Zubkov died in 1944, having never seen the opening of the metro.

The initial post-war era

In 1946 Lenmetroproyekt was created, under the leadership of M A Samodurov, to finish the construction of the metro first phase. A new version of the metro project, devised by specialists, identified two new solutions to the problems to be encountered during the metro construction.

On 3 September 1947 construction began again in the Leningrad subway, and in December 1954, the Council of Ministers of the USSR ordered the establishment of the state transport organization Leningradsky Metropoliten, to be headed by Ivan Novikov. The organisation set up its offices in the building directly above Tekhnologichesky Institut station. On 7 October 1955 the electricity was turned on in the metro, and on 5 November 1955, the act by which the first stage of the metro was put into operation, was signed. Ten years after the end of the war, at the beginning of the post-Stalin Khrushchev Thaw, the city finally got an underground transport network. The subway grand opening was held on 15 November 1955, with the first seven stations (the eighth one, Pushkinskaya opened a few months later) being put into public use. These stations later became part of the Kirovsko-Vyborgskaya Line, connecting the Moscow Rail Terminal in the city centre with the Kirovsky industrial zone in the southwest. Subsequent development included lines under the Neva River in 1958, and the construction of the Vyborgsky Radius in the mid-1970s to reach the new housing developments in the north. In 1978, the line was extended past the city limits into the Leningrad Oblast. 1,023 governmental awards were made to participants of the construction of the metro first stage.

Further development

The first expansion of the metro took place in 1958, when the first line (later to become the Kirovsko-Vyborgskaya Line) was extended beneath the Neva river to the Finlyandsky Rail Terminal. Later this same line was extended when the Vyborgsky radius, constructed in the 1970s, brought the metro to new residential areas constructed in the north-east of the city, and by 1978, those further out, in the nearby Leningrad Oblast. The metro was expanded to the south-west, with the construction of the Kirovsky radius, in 1977.

Construction of the second, Moskovsko-Petrogradskaya line began almost immediately after the initial opening of the metro. Just six years later, in 1961, the section from Tekhnologichesky Institut to Park Pobedy, along Moskovsky Prospect to the southern areas of the city, was opened. In 1963 the line was extended north to the station Petrogradskaya station; in the process making Tekhnologichesky Institut the USSR's first cross-platform interchange station. Further extension of the line was undertaken to the south in the early 1970s, and in the 1980s to the north, with the final station Parnas being opened, following numerous delays, in 2006.

The third Nevsko-Vasileostrovskaya Line was first opened in 1967 and eventually linked Vasilievsky Island, the city centre, and the industrial zones on the southeastern bank of the Neva in a series of extensions (1970, 1979, 1981 and 1984). The fourth line, Pravoberezhnaya, was opened in 1985 to serve the new residential districts on the right bank of the Neva before reaching the city centre in 1991 and continuing to the northwest in the late 1990s. It was in this period that the opening of the metro's fifth (Frunzensko-Primorskaya) line was planned, however, it was only in 2008, with the opening of Volkovskaya and Zvenigorodskaya stations, that this took place. On 7 March 2009, when the fourth line was expanded with the addition of Spasskaya station, the fifth line finally (as dictated in earlier projects) began to directly serve both the Primorsky and Frunzensky districts of Saint Petersburg.

Up until this period, it was officially known as the 'V.I. Lenin Leningrad Metro of the Order of Lenin' (Леининградский Метрополитен Ордена Ленина имени В.И.Ленина).

Modern period 

At the beginning of 1992 construction work was being carried out at 14 stations, or objects relating to them. These were six stations of the Primorsky radius (Admiralteyskaya, Sportivnaya, Chkalovskaya, Krestovsky Ostrov, Staraya Derevnya, and Komendantsky Prospekt), two stations on the fourth line (Spasskaya and transfer tunnels to  Sadovaya station), Parnas and the 'Vyborg' depot on line 2, and five stations of the Frunzensky radius (Zvenigorodskaya, Obvodny Kanal, Volkovskaya, Bukharestskaya, and Mezhdunarodnaya). Thus, it was believed, considering the average time of construction of a metro station in Saint Petersburg being equal to 5.6 years, that, with sufficient funding, all the works mentioned above would be completed by no later than 1997; a record in the history of the construction of the St. Petersburg metro. This however, was not achieved, and the plans were only completed in late 2012.

In 1994 it was planned, over 10 years, to massively extend the metro and almost "double" its size, building three new lines and 61 new stations. However, in reality, over this period until 2004, just 6 stations were opened. At this point the metro considered funding construction through a system of individual stage and station sponsorship. Saint Petersburg's unforgiving geology has frequently hampered attempts by Metro builders. The most notable case took place on the Kirovsko-Vyborgskaya Line. While constructing the line in the 1970s, the tunnelers entered an underground cavity of the Neva River. They managed to complete the tunnel, but in 1995 the tunnel had to be closed and a section of it between Lesnaya and Ploschad Muzhestva flooded. For more than nine years, the northern segment of the line was physically cut off from the rest of the system. A new set of tunnels was built and in June 2004 normal service was restored.

Lines

Line 1 (Kirovsko-Vyborgskaya)

Kirovsko-Vyborgskaya ("Kirovsky [district]–Vyborgsky [district]") Line is the oldest line of the metro, opened in 1955. The original stations are very beautiful and elaborately decorated, especially Avtovo and Narvskaya. The line connects four out of five Saint Petersburg's main railway stations. In 1995, a flooding occurred in a tunnel between Lesnaya and Ploschad Muzhestva stations and, for nine years, the line was separated into two independent segments (the gap was connected by a shuttle bus route). The line contains three of the six shallow stations that are present in the metro.

The line cuts Saint Petersburg centre on a northeast–southwest axis. In the south its alignment follows the shore of the Gulf of Finland. In the north it extends outside the city limits into the Leningrad oblast (it is the only line to stretch beyond the city boundary). The Kirovsko-Vyborgskaya Line generally coloured red on Metro maps.

Line 2 (Moskovsko-Petrogradskaya)

Moskovsko-Petrogradskaya ("Moskovsky [district]–Petrogradsky [district]") Line is the second oldest line of the metro, opened in 1961. It featured the first cross-platform transfer in the USSR. It was also the first metro line in Saint Petersburg to feature a unique platform type that soon became dubbed as "Horizontal Lift".
The line cuts Saint Petersburg on a north-south axis and is generally coloured blue on Metro maps. In 2006, as an extension was opened, it became the longest line on the system.

Line 3 (Nevsko-Vasileostrovskaya)

Nevsko-Vasileostrovskaya ("Nevsky [district]–Vasileostrovsky [district]") Line is a line of the metro, opened in 1967. Since 1994, it has been officially designated as Line 3. It stands out among St. Petersburg metro lines for two reasons : its stations are almost exclusively  of  "Horizontal Lift" type and it has the longest inter-station tunnels in the entire system. Metro officials originally intended to add stations in-between the existing ones, but those plans were later abandoned.

The line cuts Saint Petersburg centre on an east-west axis and then turns southeast following the left bank of the Neva River. It is generally coloured green on Metro maps.

Line 4 (Lakhtinsko-Pravoberezhnaya)

Lakhtinsko-Pravoberezhnaya ("Lakhta–Right Bank") Line, initially known just as Pravoberezhnaya ("Right Bank") line, was opened in 1985. It is the shortest line in the system with the stations featuring a modern design.

The line originally opened to provide access from the centre for the new residential areas in the eastern part of city, along the right bank of the Neva River. However, delays in the construction of the future Line 5, compelled to temporarily link the already completed northern part of the Line 5 (starting from Sadovaya) to Pravoberezhnaya Line, as they felt that it was better to have a single connected line rather than two unconnected ones. From that point on, the line expanded northward, as per original plans of Line 5 expansion.

On 7 March 2009 Spasskaya station was completed, creating the city's first three-way transfer and it officially became the new terminal for Line 4. As per the original plan, all Line 4 stations north of Dostoyevskaya were absorbed into the recently opened Line 5.

Line 5 (Frunzensko-Primorskaya)

Frunzensko-Primorskaya ("Frunzensky [district]–Primorsky [district]") Line connects the city's historical centre to the northwestern and southern districts. The line is planned to be expanded to the north.

The line originally opened in December 2008. It contained only two stations until 7 March 2009, when the Line 4 (Pravoberezhnaya Line) segment between Komendantsky Prospekt and Sadovaya stations became a part of the new line.

Line 6 (Krasnosel'sko-Kalininskaya)

Krasnosel'sko-Kalininskaya ("Krasnosel'sky [district]–Kalininsky [district]") Line will go from the southwest of Saint Petersburg, through the city centre, to the northeast of the city. The first stage which consists of two stations is under construction and should be opened about 2024. These stations are Yugo-Zapadnaya (Kazakovskaya) and Putilovskaya.

Stations

Some of the features of the Saint Petersburg Metro make it stand out amongst others, even those in the former USSR. It is customary to have stations in the centre of a city built very deep, not only to minimise disruption, but also, because of the Cold War threat, they were built to double as bomb shelters, and many old stations do feature provisions such as blast doors and air filters. In most cities, the lines become shallow or even begin to run above ground as they reach the city's outer residential districts. However, this is not the case in Saint Petersburg. The difficult geology means that all but 9 stations are at a deep level. The design and architecture went through numerous phases. The original stations were predominantly of the pylon type, of which there are 15 stations. Also popular was the column layout, and there are 16 such stations in the system.

The first stage is exquisitely decorated in the Stalinist Architecture style, but from 1958, Nikita Khrushchev's struggle with decorative extras restricted the vivid decorations to simple aesthetic themes. During this time a new design called "horizontal lift" became widespread, and 10 stations were built with this layout.  The horizontal lift design is a variation of a station with platform screen doors, and has not been found elsewhere outside Saint Petersburg. However, because the design became unpopular with passengers, and for technical reasons, no stations featuring this design were built between 1972 and 2018. From the mid-1970s, a new open "single-vault" design was developed by local engineers and became very popular, not only in Saint Petersburg, but some other cities as well. Known technically as Leningradky Odnosvod, it remains the most popular of all and there are 16 such stations in the city.

The remaining stations are located virtually on the edge of the city, and one, Devyatkino, is territorially in Leningrad Oblast, far away from the harsh underground geology that forms the Neva Delta. The six shallow column stations are located in the southern and northwestern sections of the city, and the first three are found on the Kirovsko-Vyborgskaya Line. The first one, Avtovo, is considered to be one of the most beautiful stations in the world and was opened as part of the first stage in 1955, while the other two were built in the late 1970s as typical Moscow-style pillar trispan stations. There are two shallow-column stations on the Nevsko-Vasileostrovskaya Line: Novokrestovskaya and Begovaya. Both of these stations, which use a modified version of the horizontal lift design, were opened in May 2018 as part of the line's extension to the northwestern section of the city. A sixth shallow-column station, Dunayskaya, opened in October 2019 as part of the Frunzensko-Primorskaya Line's southern extension. In addition, there are four termini stations that are on the surface and are located near the lines' connection with the train depots. The city's northern climate means that even here all of the station space is inside an enclosed structure.

Network map

Plans

The Metro has a very large expansion plan for the next half century. The Pravoberezhnaya Line was split in early 2009, and the new fifth line (Frunzensko-Primorskaya) took the northern (Primorsky) radius away from Pravoberezhnaya and opened with a new section (Frunzensky) to the south. The Pravoberezhnaya line will extend to the west, and then north to Lakhta, and then to Yuntolovo. The two stations, Bukharestskaya and Mezhdunarodnaya of the Frunzensko-Primorskaya line, opened in December 2012, will be followed by another three heading southward - Prospekt Slavy, Dunayskaya and Shushary. These should be open in 2018. Three new lines, Krasnoselsko-Kalininskaya, Admiralteysko-Okhtinskaya and Koltsevaya, will be opened. The first six stations of the Krasnoselsko-Kalininskaya line are already under construction, and should be open by 2020. The Admiralteysko-Okhtinskaya line should appear before 2025. The Koltsevaya line will be opened after 2025.

Delays due to the difficult geology of the city's underground and to the insufficient funding have cut down these plans, as of 2014 (2 new stations later), to 17 new stations and one new depot until 2025.

At the same time, there are several short and mid-term projects on station upgrades, including escalator replacements and lighting upgrades.

Operation
The Metro is managed by the state municipal company Sankt-Peterburgsky Metropoliten (Saint Petersburg Metropolitan) that was privatised from the Ministry of Rail Services. The Metro was renamed to coincide with the city's name change in the early 1990s. The company employs several thousand men and women in station and track management as well as rolling stock operation and maintenance.

The Metro is financed by the city of Saint Petersburg, from passenger fares, and from advertisement space at the stations and on the trains. Metro construction is undertaken by the subsidiary Lenmetrostroy that is financed by the Metro as well as directly by the Ministry of Transportation.

Rolling stock

The rolling stock of the metro is provided by five depots with a total of 1403 cars forming 188 trains. Most of the models are the Metrowagonmash 81-717/714 that are very common in all ex-Soviet cities. In addition there are older E and Em type trains on the Kirovsko-Vyborgskaya Line and newer 81-540/541 (built by Škoda Transportation unit Vagonmash) on the Pravoberezhnaya and Fruzenskaya-Primorskaya Line. In addition, the Metro has also received 81-722 and 81-724 cars from Metrowagonmash, which are custom models specifically for Saint Petersburg.  Both these and the Skoda cars are equipped with sliding doors that go in to pockets rather than the plug doors now being used elsewhere.  This is due to the fact that several stations on the system have platform doors that do not permit sufficient clearance for the plug ones. Transmashholding unveiled a new prototype train for the St Petersburg Metro in June 2019, no orders have been placed as of November 23, 2019.

Security
The Metro was originally built as a system that could offer shelter in case of a nuclear attack. Every station is equipped with CCTV surveillance following recent terrorist threats. Until the summer of 2009, all photography and video filming in the Metro required a written permit. However, because of a legal challenge by an amateur photographer, after 24 August 2009, photography without a flash can be done without a permit.

Incidents

Terrorist bombings

Approximately fourteen  people died and over 50 sustained injuries from an explosion 3 April 2017 on a train between Sennaya Ploshchad and Tekhnologicheski Institut stations, on the Line 2. The explosion occurred at 2:20 pm, local time. Seven individuals were confirmed DOA, while others were rushed to hospital. Russian President Vladimir Putin's hometown is Saint Petersburg, and he was in the city visiting when the attack occurred. He issued  condolence statements to the victims' families immediately after the blast.

Russia's National Anti-Terrorism Committee also on 3 April defused an improvised explosive device at Ploshchad Vosstaniya station, on the Line 1.

See also
List of metro systems
Buses in Saint Petersburg

References

External links

 Peteburgsky Metropoliten - Official website
 Saint-Petersburg Metro - Metro map and operation time
 Thoughts about Petersburg Metro - Extensive resource site supported by Metrofan djtonik
 Metrowalks - Excellent collection of photographs of every station and transfers.
 o-metro - Large technical and photo collection by Metrofan Alexey Nevolin
 Kommet - Official advertisement bureau with interactive map
 Podzemka - Extensive collection of maps and schemes, including rare historical ones.
Urbanrail.net - Saint Petersburg Metro section
 Metrosoyuza - Site supported by Metrofan Peter Donn
  - Technical details.
 Metroworld - Information on the Metro.
 Piter.metro.ru - Informative site, but inactive for about four years
 St.Peterburg for tourist - Scheme of the Petersburg underground
Photos of St.Peterburg metro (with google automatic translate)

 
Underground rapid transit in Russia
1955 establishments in Russia
Electric railways in Russia
Rail transport in Saint Petersburg
Rail transport in Leningrad Oblast
Tunnels in Russia
Buildings and structures built in the Soviet Union
Buildings and structures in Saint Petersburg
Unitary Enterprises of Russia
Companies based in Saint Petersburg